bibliotek.dk is a Danish Internet service that allows for search for materials in public Danish libraries. It is a library catalog.

Search targets include books, newspaper and journal articles, LP records, DVD, CD-ROMs, etc. Material from Danish libraries can be requested and sent to the local library.

Dansk BiblioteksCenter (DBC), a state-owned limited liability company, develops and maintains the service.

See also
Danish National Library Authority

External links
 Bibliotek.dk
 Dansk BiblioteksCenter (DBC) official site in English

Bibliographic databases and indexes
Government databases in Denmark